The Dongnam District (Hanja: 東南區; Dongnam-gu) is a non-autonomous district in the city of Cheonan in South Chungcheong Province, South Korea.

Administrative divisions 
Dongnam-gu is divided into one town (eup), 7 townships (myeon), and 9 neighbourhoods (dong).

See also 
 Seobuk District

References

External links 
  

Districts of Cheonan